SPC Vojvodina, short for Sports and Business Center Vojvodina, commonly referred to as SPENS, is a multi-purpose venue located in Novi Sad, Vojvodina, Serbia.

History

Its construction started in 1979, based on the design documentation produced by the Institute of Architecture, Urbanism and Spatial Planning, at the University of Sarajevo. The authors of the original, competition-winning design were Prof. Zivorad Jankovic, Prof. Branko Bulic and Eng. Dusko Bogunovic. The construction of the main and the small hall was completed in less than two years. On 14 April 1981, the complex opened its door for the first time, its inaugural event being the 1981 World Table Tennis Championships, event named "SPENS '81" at the time (later the venue was unofficially named after the event name). In the following years, additional objects were opened. However, several objects were not constructed even though they were in the project, like open swimming pool, open skating rink and open courts for team sports.

As of 2019, SPENS is operated by the state-owned company JP "Sportski i poslovni centar Vojvodina", which in addition to SPENS also has Sports Center Sajmište under its umbrella.

Features
Sprawling over 85,000 m2, SPENS consists of Main Hall (capacity: 6,987 seats), Small Hall (capacity: 1,030), ice-hockey rink (capacity: 1,623), bowling alley, shooting range, 3 training halls, swimming pool, 11 tennis courts, media center, 2 press centers, amphitheater, reception salon, conference hall, double-level garage, and 215 retail and business spaces that house banks, furniture stores, tourist agencies, jewelers, bookstores, pool halls, fitness clubs, boutiques, etc.

Sports
SPENS' most famous residents are basketball's KK Vojvodina Srbijagas (participating in Basketball League of Serbia) and volleyball's OK Vojvodina.

In 1987, Spens hosted basketball's European Cup Winners' Cup Final in which Cibona Zagreb defeated Scavolini Pesaro 89–74.

The venue received its biggest media exposure when it hosted round-robin action of EuroBasket 2005 in group D which consisted of Spain, Latvia, Israel and host country Serbia and Montenegro. For this occasion, SPENS underwent major renovation that included improvements to building's technological capabilities, overhaul of its media center and addition of two video boards – one on each end of the main hall.

The arena hosted the Group C (group stage) of and the Group II of the main round of the 2012 European Men's Handball Championship, which featured national teams of Spain, Croatia, France, Hungary, Slovenia and Iceland .

Since volleyball is very popular in Novi Sad, Serbia men's national volleyball team often plays its FIVB World League home matches in SPENS, as well as its friendly warm-up games.

Gallery

Concerts and events
In addition to sporting events, SPENS is often used as a venue for concerts, film premieres, conventions, etc. The first ever concert held at SPENS was of pop-rock band Sedmorica mladih, drawing a crowd of 5,000 people. Some of the other concerts have been:

See also
 List of indoor arenas in Serbia

References

External links

 
 PRELISTAVAMO STARE FOTOGRAFIJE: Ovako je građen Spens 

Indoor arenas in Serbia
Basketball venues in Serbia
Buildings and structures in Novi Sad
2012 European Women's Handball Championship